Bala is a village in Harchandpur block of Rae Bareli district, Uttar Pradesh, India. As of 2011, its population is 4,123, in 801 households. It has one primary school and no healthcare facilities.

The 1961 census recorded Bala as comprising 8 hamlets, with a total population of 1,743 people (825 male and 918 female), in 379 households and 374 physical houses. The area of the village was given as 1,783 acres.

The 1981 census recorded Bala as having a population of 2,183 people, in 452 households, and having an area of 640.24 hectares. The main staple foods were given as wheat and barley.

References

Villages in Raebareli district